The 1998 MicronPC Bowl was an American college football bowl game that was played on December 29, 1998, at Pro Player Stadium in Miami Gardens, Florida. The game matched the Miami Hurricanes against the North Carolina State Wolfpack. The game began at 7:35 p.m. EST and aired on TBS. It was the final contest of the 1999 NCAA Division I-A football season for both teams, and ended in a 46–23 victory for Miami. This was the ninth edition of what was originally the Blockbuster Bowl, and first edition (of three) sponsored by MicronPC.

Game summary

Scoring summary

Source:

Statistics

References

MicronPC Bowl
Cheez-It Bowl
Miami Hurricanes football bowl games
NC State Wolfpack football bowl games
Sports competitions in Miami Gardens, Florida
December 1998 sports events in the United States
1998 in sports in Florida